The Ambassador Extraordinary and Plenipotentiary of the Russian Federation to the Republic of Côte d'Ivoire is the official representative of the President and the Government of the Russian Federation to the President and the Government of Ivory Coast.

The Russian ambassador and his staff work at large in the Embassy of Russia in Abidjan. Since the closure of the embassy in Ouagadougou in neighbouring Burkina Faso in 1992, the ambassador to Ivory Coast has dual accreditation as the ambassador to Burkina Faso.

History of diplomatic relations

Diplomatic relations between the Soviet Union and Ivory Coast were established on 18 February 1967. The first ambassador, was appointed on 7 September 1967 and presented his credentials on 13 November 1967. At the behest of the Ivorian government, diplomatic relations were severed in 1969 and the ambassadors were withdrawn. Diplomatic relations were restored on 21 August 1986, and Boris Minakov was appointed as ambassador. With the dissolution of the Soviet Union in 1991 the incumbent Soviet ambassador, continued as representative of the Russian Federation until 1995. With the closure of the embassy of Ouagadougou in Burkina Faso in 1992, the ambassador to Ivory Coast has also been accredited as the non-resident ambassador to Burkina Faso.

List of representatives (1967 – present)

Representatives of the Soviet Union to Ivory Coast (1967 – 1991)

Representatives of the Russian Federation to Ivory Coast (1991 – present)

References

 
Ivory Coast
Russia